Bala Mahalleh-ye Pashaki (also Romanized as Bālā Maḩalleh-ye Pāshākī; also known as Pashakh, Pāshākī, Pāshākī Bālā Maḩalleh, and Pāshkī) is a village in Lafmejan Rural District, in the Central District of Lahijan County, Gilan Province, Iran. At the 2006 census, its population was 1,494, in 509 families.

References 

Populated places in Lahijan County